And the Music Speaks is the second album by the American group All-4-One, released on June 6, 1995. It features their Top 5 Pop hit "I Can Love You Like That" which earned the group another Grammy nomination.

Track listing
"I Can Love You Like That" - 4:22 (Jennifer Kimball, Maribeth Derry, Steve Diamond) 
"I'm Sorry" -  4:54 (Delious Kennedy, Gary St. Clair, Jamie Jones, Reggie Green)
"These Arms" -  5:01 (Frank J. Meyers, Gary Baker)
"I'm Your Man" -  5:26 (Bo Watson, Melvin Arthur Gentry)
"Giving You My Heart Forever" -  4:56 (Kennedty, St. Clair, Jones, Green)
"Could This Be Magic" -  3:47 (Hiram Johnson, Richard Blandon)
"Love Is More Than Just A Four Letter Word" -  5:08 (James Guillory, Stephanie Alexander)
"Think You're the One for Me" -  4:33 (St. Clair, Jones, Green)
"Colors of Love" -  5:24 (St. Clair, Carl Wurtz, Randy Camera)
"Roll Call" -  5:33 (Kennedy, St. Clair, Jones, Guillory, Tim O'Brien, Alfred Nevarez, Tony Borowiak)
"Here for You" -  5:24 (St. Clair, Kennedy)
"We Dedicate" -  3:28 (Kennedy, Borowiak, Jones, Nevarez)

Charts

Weekly charts

Year-end charts

Certifications

Singles
"These Arms" - March 19, 1995
"I Can Love You Like That" - June 6, 1995
"I'm Your Man" - October 10, 1995

References

1995 albums
Atlantic Records albums
All-4-One albums
Albums produced by David Foster